Matthew 15:24 is a verse in the fifteenth chapter of the Gospel of Matthew in the New Testament.

Content
In the original Greek according to Westcott-Hort for this verse is:
Ὁ δὲ ἀποκριθεὶς εἶπεν, Οὐκ ἀπεστάλην εἰ μὴ εἰς τὰ πρόβατα τὰ ἀπολωλότα οἴκου Ἰσραήλ.  

In the King James Version of the Bible the text reads:
But he answered and said, I am not sent but unto the lost sheep of the house of Israel.

The New International Version translates the passage as:
He answered, "I was sent only to the lost sheep of Israel."

Analysis
Jesus states here that he was sent, literally that He is not an Apostle for the Gentiles but for Jews, in accord with the prediction of the prophets. This was done so there would be no pretext for the Jews rejecting Him as the promised Messiah (see Rom. 15:8, 9).

Analysis==Two
The kingdom of Israel was divided, by their God, into two separate nations. The Southern kingdom called The House Of Judah. It consisted of the tribe of Judah (Jews) and Levi, the Levitical Priesthood. The capital city was Jerusalem.
The second, the Northern Kingdom, The House Of Israel consisted of the remaining ten tribes. It's capital was Samaria.
The two kingdoms remained separated and had separate lines of rulers over each. This history can be found in the books of the King's and Chronicles.
The children of Israel are described many times in Old Testament prophetic books as figuratively being sheep. The religious leaders being shepherds of the flock.
The Northern kingdom was punished by God for rejecting the covenant of and turning to pagan gods. As punishment on the Northern Kingdom God allowed the nation of Assyria to invade their land and conquer The House Of Israel.
The Southern Kingdom, House Of Judah remained untouched.
The Northern Kingdom was taken away from their land and ended up being scattered into the gentile nations. Over the centuries and generations they lost their identity and were absorbed into the populations where they lived. 
They were called "lost sheep". It was propheciesed that at an appointed time God send shepherds  to find and return them back into covenant with The House Of Judah.
Those lost sheep of Israel spoken of by Jesus in Matt.15 were the descendants of the lost House Of Israel, who were still scattered in the gentile nations.
The Jews never lost their identity  and in the time of Jesus were very well known. 
Without an understanding of the Old Testament history and prophecy, the New Testament can not be clearly understood.

Commentary from the Church Fathers
Jerome: "He says that He is not sent to the Gentiles, but that He is sent first to Israel, so that when they would not receive the Gospel, the passing over to the Gentiles might have just cause."

Saint Remigius: "In this way also He was sent specially to the Jews, because He taught them by His bodily presence."

Jerome: "And He adds of the house of Israel, with this design, that we might rightly interpret by this place that other parable concerning the stray sheep."

References

External links
Other translations of Matthew 15:24 at BibleHub

15:24